The Remains of the Day is a 1993 drama film adapted from the Booker Prize-winning 1988 novel of the same name by Kazuo Ishiguro. The film was directed by James Ivory, produced by Ismail Merchant, Mike Nichols, and John Calley and adapted by Ruth Prawer Jhabvala. It stars Anthony Hopkins as James Stevens and Emma Thompson as Miss Kenton, with James Fox, Christopher Reeve, Hugh Grant, Ben Chaplin, and Lena Headey in supporting roles.

The film was a critical and box office success and it was nominated for eight Academy Awards, including Best Picture, Best Actor (Hopkins), Best Actress (Thompson) and Best Adapted Screenplay (Jhabvala). In 1999, the British Film Institute ranked The Remains of the Day the 64th-greatest British film of the 20th century.

Plot
In 1958 postwar Britain, Stevens, the butler of Darlington Hall, receives a letter from the former housekeeper, Miss Kenton. Their past employer, the Earl of Darlington, has died a broken man, his reputation destroyed by his prewar support of Germany, and his stately country house has been sold to retired US Congressman Jack Lewis. Allowed to borrow the Daimler, Stevens sets off for the West Country to see Miss Kenton for the first time in decades.

A flashback to the 1930s shows Kenton's arrival at Darlington Hall, where the ever-efficient but deeply repressed Stevens derives his entire identity from his profession. He butts heads with the warmer, strong-willed Kenton, particularly when Stevens refuses to acknowledge that his aging father, now an under-butler, is no longer able to perform his duties. Displaying total professionalism, Stevens carries on as his father lies dying during Darlington's conference of like-minded, fascist-sympathising British and European aristocrats. Also in attendance is Congressman Lewis, who admonishes the "gentleman politicians" as meddling amateurs, advising that "Europe has become the arena of Realpolitik" and warning of impending disaster.

Later, Stevens is unable to answer an aristocratic guest's questions on global trade and politics, which the man claims to demonstrate the lower classes' ignorance and inability to govern themselves. Exposed to Nazi racial laws, Darlington has Stevens dismiss two newly appointed, refugee German-Jewish maids, despite his protest. Kenton threatens to resign, but has nowhere to go, while a regretful Darlington is later unable to rehire the maids. Relations thaw between Stevens and Kenton, and she clearly shows her feelings for him, but the outwardly detached Stevens remains dedicated solely to his role as butler. She catches him reading a romance novel, which he explains is to improve his vocabulary, asking her not to invade his privacy again.

Lord Darlington's godson, journalist Reginald Cardinal, arrives on the day of a secret meeting at Darlington Hall between British Prime Minister Neville Chamberlain and German ambassador Joachim von Ribbentrop. Appalled by his godfather's role in seeking appeasement for Nazi Germany, Cardinal tells Stevens that Darlington is being used by the Nazis, but Stevens feels it is not his place to judge his employer. Kenton forms a relationship with former co-worker Tom Benn, and accepts his proposal. She informs Stevens as an ultimatum, but he will not admit his feelings and only offers his congratulations. Finding her crying, his only response is to call her attention to a neglected domestic task, and she leaves Darlington Hall before the start of the Second World War.

En route to meeting Kenton in 1958, Stevens is mistaken for gentry at a pub. Doctor Carlisle, a local GP, helps him refuel the Daimler and deduces that he is actually a manservant, asking his thoughts about Lord Darlington's actions. Denying having even met him, Stevens later admits to having served and respected him, but that Darlington confessed that his Nazi sympathies were misguided and naive. Stevens declares that although Lord Darlington was unable to correct his terrible error, he is attempting to correct his own. He meets Kenton, who has separated from her husband and runs a coastal boarding house. They reminisce that Lord Darlington died from a broken heart after suing a newspaper for libel, losing the suit and his reputation, and Stevens mentions that Cardinal was killed in the war.

Kenton, now Mrs. Benn, declines to resume her position at Darlington Hall, wishing to remain near her pregnant grown daughter and, despite years of unhappiness, she may go back to her husband. Stevens suggests they may never meet again and they part fondly, but are both quietly upset, Miss Kenton visibly tearful as her bus pulls away. Stevens returns to Darlington Hall, where Lewis asks if he remembers the old days, and Stevens replies that he was too busy serving. They free a pigeon from the house and it flies away, leaving Stevens and Darlington Hall far behind.

Cast

Production
A film adaptation of the novel was originally planned to be directed by Mike Nichols from a script by Harold Pinter. Some of Pinter's script was used in the film, but, while Pinter was paid for his work, he asked to have his name removed from the credits, in keeping with his contract. Christopher C. Hudgins observes: "During our 1994 interview, Pinter told [Steven H.] Gale and me that he had learned his lesson after the revisions imposed on his script for The Handmaid's Tale, which he has decided not to publish. When his script for The Remains of the Day was radically revised by the James Ivory–Ismail Merchant partnership, he refused to allow his name to be listed in the credits" (125). Though no longer the director, Nichols remained associated with the project as one of its producers.

The music was recorded at Windmill Lane Studios in Dublin.

Settings
A number of English country estates were used as locations for the film, partly owing to the persuasive power of Ismail Merchant, who was able to cajole permission for the production to borrow houses not normally open to the public. Among them were Dyrham Park for the exterior of the house and the driveway, Powderham Castle (staircase, hall, music room, bedroom; used for the aqua-turquoise stairway scenes), Corsham Court (library and dining room) and Badminton House (servants' quarters, conservatory, entrance hall). Luciana Arrighi, the production designer, scouted most of these locations. Scenes were also shot in Weston-super-Mare, which stood in for Clevedon. The pub where Mr Stevens stays is the Hop Pole in Limpley Stoke; the shop featured is also in Limpley Stoke. The pub where Miss Kenton and Mr Benn meet is The George Inn in Norton St Philip.

Characters
The character of Sir Geoffrey Wren is based loosely on that of Sir Oswald Mosley, a British fascist active in the 1930s. Wren is depicted as a strict vegetarian, like Hitler. The 3rd Viscount Halifax (later created the 1st Earl of Halifax) also appears in the film. Lord Darlington tells Stevens that Halifax approved of the polish on the silver, and Lord Halifax himself later appears when Darlington meets secretly with the German Ambassador and his aides at night. Halifax was a chief architect of the British policy of appeasement from 1937 to 1939. The character of Congressman Jack Lewis in the film is a composite of two separate American characters in Kazuo Ishiguro's novel: Senator Lewis (who attends the pre-WW2 conference in Darlington Hall), and Mr Farraday, who succeeds Lord Darlington as master of Darlington Hall.

Soundtrack

The original score was composed by Richard Robbins. It was nominated for the Academy Award for Best Original Score, but lost to Schindler's List.

Track listing
Opening Titles, Darlington Hall – 7:27
The Keyhole and the Chinaman – 4:14
Tradition and Order – 1:51
The Conference Begins – 1:33
Sei Mir Gegrüsst (Schubert) – 4:13
The Cooks in the Kitchen – 1:34
Sir Geoffrey Wren and Stevens, Sr. – 2:41
You Mean a Great Deal to This House – 2:21
Loss and Separation – 6:19
Blue Moon – 4:57
Sentimental Love Story/Appeasement/In the Rain – 5:22
A Portrait Returns/Darlington Hall/End Credits – 6:54

Critical reception
The film has a 96% rating on Rotten Tomatoes based on 45 reviews, with an average rating of 8.5/10. The consensus states: "Smart, elegant, and blessed with impeccable performances from Anthony Hopkins and Emma Thompson, The Remains of the Day is a Merchant–Ivory classic." At Metacritic, which assigns a weighted average out of 100 to critics' reviews, it received a score of 86 based on 12 reviews. Audiences polled by CinemaScore gave the film an average grade of "A-" on an A+ to F scale.

Roger Ebert particularly praised the film, calling it "a subtle, thoughtful movie." In his favorable review for The Washington Post, Desson Howe wrote, "Put Anthony Hopkins, Emma Thompson and James Fox together and you can expect sterling performances." Vincent Canby of The New York Times said, in another favorable review, "Here's a film for adults. It's also about time to recognize that Mr. Ivory is one of our finest directors, something that critics tend to overlook because most of his films have been literary adaptations."

The film was named as one of the best films of 1993 by over 50 critics, making it the fifth-most-acclaimed film of 1993.

Awards and nominations

 The film is #64 at the British Film Institute's "Top 100 British films".
 The film was also nominated for the American Film Institute's "100 Years...100 Passions" list.

See also
 BFI Top 100 British films
 Cliveden set

Notes

References

Bibliography 
 Gale, Steven H. Sharp Cut: Harold Pinter's Screenplays and the Artistic Process. Lexington, Ky.: The University Press of Kentucky, 2003.
 Gale, Steven H., ed. The Films of Harold Pinter. Albany: SUNY Press, 2001.
 Hudgins, Christopher C. "Harold Pinter's Lolita: 'My Sin, My Soul'." In The Films of Harold Pinter. Steven H. Gale, ed. Albany, N.Y.: SUNY Press, 2001.
 Hudgins, Christopher C. "Three Unpublished Harold Pinter Filmscripts: The Handmaid's Tale, The Remains of the Day, Lolita." The Pinter Review: Nobel Prize / Europe Theatre Prize Volume: 2005 – 2008. Francis Gillen with Steven H. Gale, eds. Tampa, Fla.: University of Tampa Press, 2008.

External links
 
 
 
 
The Remains of the Day at Merchant Ivory Productions
 
 

1993 films
1993 drama films
American drama films
British drama films
BAFTA winners (films)
Films based on British novels
Films directed by James Ivory
Films set in England
Films set in 1935
Films set in 1936
Films set in 1938
Films set in 1956
Merchant Ivory Productions films
Films with screenplays by Harold Pinter
Films with screenplays by Ruth Prawer Jhabvala
Films set in country houses
Films about social class
Domestic workers in films
Films about Nazism
Columbia Pictures films
1990s English-language films
1990s American films
1990s British films